Mahur (also Romanized as Māhūr; also known as Māleḩ-e Māhūr) is a village in Tarrah Rural District, Hamidiyeh District, Ahvaz County, Khuzestan Province, Iran. At the 2006 census, its population was 126, in 16 families.

References 

Populated places in Ahvaz County